On May 14, 1867, the 27–year-old Charles Sanders Peirce, who eventually founded pragmatism, presented a paper entitled "On a New List of Categories" to the American Academy of Arts and Sciences. Among other things, this paper outlined a theory of predication involving three universal categories that Peirce continued to apply in philosophy and elsewhere for the rest of his life. The categories demonstrate and concentrate the pattern seen in "How to Make Our Ideas Clear" (1878, the foundational paper for pragmatism), and other three-way distinctions in Peirce's work.

The Categories
In Aristotle's logic, categories are adjuncts to reasoning that are designed to resolve equivocations, ambiguities that make expressions or signs recalcitrant to being ruled by logic. Categories help the reasoner to render signs ready for the application of logical laws. An equivocation is a variation in meaning—a manifold of sign senses—such that, as Aristotle put it about names in the opening of Categories (1.1a1–12), "Things are said to be named 'equivocally' when, though they have a common name, the definition corresponding with the name differs for each". So Peirce's claim that three categories are sufficient amounts to an assertion that all manifolds of meaning can be unified in just three steps.

The following passage is critical to the understanding of Peirce's Categories:

The first thing to extract from this passage is the fact that Peirce's Categories, or "Predicaments", are predicates of predicates. Meaningful predicates have both extension and intension, so predicates of predicates get their meanings from at least two sources of information, namely, the classes of relations and the qualities of qualities to which they refer. Considerations like these tend to generate hierarchies of subject matters, extending through what is traditionally called the logic of second intentions, or what is handled very roughly by second order logic in contemporary parlance, and continuing onward through higher intensions, or higher order logic and type theory.

Peirce arrived at his own system of three categories after a thoroughgoing study of his predecessors, with special reference to the categories of Aristotle, Kant, and Hegel. The names that he used for his own categories varied with context and occasion, but ranged from reasonably intuitive terms like quality, reaction, and representation to maximally abstract terms like firstness, secondness, and thirdness, respectively. Taken in full generality, nth-ness can be understood as referring to those properties that all n-adic relations have in common. Peirce's distinctive claim is that a type hierarchy of three levels is generative of all that we need in logic.

Part of the justification for Peirce's claim that three categories are both necessary and sufficient appears to arise from mathematical ideas about the reducibility of n-adic relations. According to Peirce's Reduction Thesis, (a) triads are necessary because genuinely triadic relations cannot be completely analyzed in terms of monadic and dyadic predicates, and (b) triads are sufficient because there are no genuinely tetradic or larger polyadic relations—all higher-arity n-adic relations can be analyzed in terms of triadic and lower-arity relations. Others, notably Robert Burch (1991), Joachim Hereth Correia and Reinhard Pöschel (2006), have offered proofs of the Reduction Thesis.

There have been proposals by Donald Mertz, Herbert Schneider, Carl Hausman, and Carl Vaught to augment Peirce's threefolds to fourfolds; and one by Douglas Greenlee to reduce them to twofolds.

Peirce introduces his Categories and their theory in "On a New List of Categories" (1867), a work which is cast as a Kantian deduction and is short but dense and difficult to summarize. The following table is compiled from that and later works.

(The context for interpretants is not psychology or sociology, but instead philosophical logic. In a sense, an interpretant is whatever can be understood as a conclusion of an inference. The context for the categories as categories is phenomenology, which Peirce also called phaneroscopy and categorics.)

See also
Trikonic

Notes

Bibliography
 Peirce, C.S. (1867), "On a New List of Categories", Proceedings of the American Academy of Arts and Sciences 7 (1868), 287–298. Presented, 14 May 1867. Reprinted (Collected Papers, vol. 1, paragraphs 545–559), (The Essential Peirce, vol. 1, pp. 1–10), (Chronological Edition, vol. 2, pp. 49–59), Eprint.
 Peirce, C.S. (1885), "One, Two, Three: Fundamental Categories of Thought and of Nature", Manuscript 901; the Collected Papers, vol. 1, paragraphs 369-372 and 376-378 parts; the Chronological Edition, vol. 5, 242-247
 Peirce, C.S. (1887–1888), "A Guess At the Riddle", Manuscript 909; The Essential Peirce, vol. 1, pp. 245–279; Eprint
 Peirce, C.S. (1888), "Trichotomic", The Essential Peirce, vol. 1, p. 180.
 Peirce, C.S. (1893), "The Categories", Manuscript 403   An incomplete rewrite by Peirce of his 1867 paper "On a New List of Categories." Interleaved by Joseph Ransdell (ed.) with the 1867 paper itself for purposes of comparison.
 Peirce, C.S.,, "The Logic of Mathematics; An Attempt to Develop My Categories from Within", the Collected Papers, vol. 1, paragraphs 417–519. Eprint
 Peirce, C.S., "Phenomenology" (editors' title for collection of articles), The Collected Papers, vol. 1, paragraphs 284-572 Eprint
 Peirce, C.S. (1903), "The Categories Defended", the third Harvard Lecture: The Harvard Lectures pp. 167–188; the Essential Peirce, vol. 1, pp. 160–178; and partly in the Collected Papers, vol. 5, paragraphs 66-81 and 88–92.
 Charles Sanders Peirce bibliography

External links

 Arisbe: The Peirce Gateway, Joseph Ransdell, ed. Over 100 online writings by Peirce as of November 24, 2010, with annotations. 100s of online papers on Peirce. The peirce-l e-forum. Much else.
 Center for Applied Semiotics (CAS) (1998–2003), Donald Cunningham & Jean Umiker-Sebeok, Indiana U.
In Portuguese, some English.
 Commens Digital Companion to C.S. Peirce, Mats Bergman, Sami Paavola, & , formerly Commens at Helsinki U. Includes Commens Dictionary of Peirce's Terms with Peirce's definitions, often many per term across the decades, and the Digital Encyclopedia of Charles S. Peirce (old edition still at old website). 
  Peirce, Carlo Sini, Rossella Fabbrichesi, et al., U. of Milan, Italy. In Italian and English. Part of Pragma.
 Charles S. Peirce Foundation. Co-sponsoring the 2014 Peirce International Centennial Congress (100th anniversary of Peirce's death).
 Charles S. Peirce Society—Transactions of the Charles S. Peirce Society. Quarterly journal of Peirce studies since spring 1965. Table of Contents of all issues.
 Charles S. Peirce Studies, Brian Kariger, ed.

 Collegium for the Advanced Study of Picture Act and Embodiment: The Peirce Archive. Humboldt U, Berlin, Germany. Cataloguing Peirce's innumerable drawings & graphic materials. More info (Prof. Aud Sissel Hoel).
Newer edition now at Commens.
 Existential Graphs, Jay Zeman, ed., U. of Florida. Has 4 Peirce texts.
 , ed., U. of Navarra, Spain. Big study site, Peirce & others in Spanish & English, bibliography, more.
 Helsinki Peirce Research Center (HPRC), Ahti-Veikko Pietarinen et al., U. of Helsinki. 
 His Glassy Essence. Autobiographical Peirce. Kenneth Laine Ketner.
 Institute for Studies in Pragmaticism, Kenneth Laine Ketner, Clyde Hendrick, et al., Texas Tech U. Peirce's life and works.
 International Research Group on Abductive Inference,  et al., eds.,  U., Frankfurt, Germany. Uses frames. Click on link at bottom of its home page for English.
English, Portuguese.
 Peirce at Signo: Theoretical Semiotics on the Web, Louis Hébert, director, supported by U. of Québec. Theory, application, exercises of Peirce's Semiotics and Esthetics. English, French.
 Peirce Edition Project (PEP), Indiana U.-Purdue U. Indianapolis (IUPUI). André De Tienne, Nathan Houser, et al. Editors of the Writings of Charles S. Peirce (W) and The Essential Peirce (EP) v. 2. Working on W 7: Peirce's work on the Century Dictionary. Definition of the week.
 Peirce's Existential Graphs, Frithjof Dau, Germany
 Peirce's Theory of Semiosis: Toward a Logic of Mutual Affection, Joseph Esposito. Free online course.
 Pragmatism Cybrary, David Hildebrand & John Shook.
 Research Group on Semiotic Epistemology and Mathematics Education (late 1990s),  Germany). See Peirce Project Newsletter v. 3, n. 1, p. 13.
 Semiotics according to Robert Marty, with 76 definitions of the sign by C. S. Peirce.

Philosophical logic
Phenomenology
Charles Sanders Peirce
Philosophical categories